Greek conjugation  may refer to:

Modern Greek verbs
Ancient Greek verbs